Jaka Lakovič (born 9 July 1978) is a Slovenian professional basketball coach and former player. He currently serves as a head coach for Gran Canaria of the Liga ACB, as well as an assistant coach of the Slovenia national team. 

He was an All-EuroLeague Second Team selection in 2005, and he helped lead the senior Slovenia national team to the fourth place finish at 2009 EuroBasket.

Playing career

In his pro career, Lakovič played with the following clubs: Geoplin Slovan and Krka of the Slovenian League, Panathinaikos of the Greek League, Barcelona of the Spanish League, Galatasaray of the Turkish League, and Avellino of the Italian League.

His brilliant performances during the 2004–05 EuroLeague season, wearing the Panathinaikos jersey, earned him an All-EuroLeague Second Team selection, as he reached the EuroLeague Final Four. In 2005, he was also named the MVP of the Greek Cup, and the MVP of the Greek League. He won the EuroLeague championship in 2010, while a member of Barcelona.

In July 2011, he signed a two-year contract with Galatasaray. In January 2013, he signed with Sidigas Avellino, until the end of the season. In September 2013, he extended his contract with Avellino, for one more season.

In December 2014, he signed with Royal Halı Gaziantep for the 2014–15 season.

In September 2015, he signed with the Barcelona Lassa's reserve team. He also announced that would be his last year as professional basketball player, before he would begin to start coaching in the youth teams of Barcelona.

On 27 July 2016, Lakovič announced his retirement from playing professional basketball.

National team career
Lakovič competed for the senior Slovenian men's national team at the 2006 FIBA World Championship, the 2010 FIBA World Championship, and also at 7 straight EuroBaskets; 2001, 2003, 2005, 2007, 2009, 2011 and 2013.

Coaching career
Lakovič began his basketball coaching career in 2016, becoming an assistant coach for the senior Slovenian men's national team, working under the team's head coach, Igor Kokoškov, and started coaching at the EuroBasket 2017 qualification tournament.

On 7 August 2017, Lakovič signed with the Spanish ACB League club Bilbao Basket as an assistant coach. On 30 April 2018, following the departure of Veljko Mršić, he took over the club as the head coach.

In June 2019, he was announced as the new head coach of the German Basketball Bundesliga club ratiopharm Ulm.

On June 17, 2022, he has signed with Gran Canaria of the Liga ACB.

EuroLeague career statistics

|-
| style="text-align:left;"| 2001–02
| style="text-align:left;"| Krka
| 14 || 13 || 32.5 || .491 || .436 || .890 || 2.1 || 3.8 || 2.0 || .0 || 20.9 || 22.4
|-
| style="text-align:left;"| 2002–03
| style="text-align:left;"| Panathinaikos
| 19 || 6 || 23.7 || .504 || .500 || .891 || 1.8 || 2.6 || .5 || .0 || 9.4 || 9.3
|-
| style="text-align:left;"| 2003–04
| style="text-align:left;"| Panathinaikos
| 20 || 15 || 29.2 || .448 || .358 || .846 || 2.1 || 2.4 || 1.3 || .1 || 13.3 || 14.3
|-
| style="text-align:left;"| 2004–05
| style="text-align:left;"| Panathinaikos
| 25 || 19 || 31.5 || .445 || .353 || .839 || 2.1 || 2.8 || 1.4 || .0 || 15.1 || 15.7
|-
| style="text-align:left;"| 2005–06
| style="text-align:left;"| Panathinaikos
| 22 || 21 || 31.0 || .400 || .370 || .838 || 1.4 || 2.5 || 1.1 || .1 || 14.4 || 13.7
|-
| style="text-align:left;"| 2006–07
| style="text-align:left;"| Barcelona
| 23 || 19 || 24.7 || .429 || .398 || .768 || 1.7 || 3.5 || .9 || .0 || 10.3 || 11.0
|-
| style="text-align:left;"| 2007–08
| style="text-align:left;"| Barcelona
| 23 || 20 || 25.4 || .388 || .358 || .807 || 2.2 || 3.0 || 1.0 || .0 || 12.2 || 12.5
|-
| style="text-align:left;"| 2008–09
| style="text-align:left;"| Barcelona
| 18 || 11 || 22.6 || .435 || .413 || .881 || 1.3 || 2.9 || .8 || .0 || 9.9 || 10.3
|-
| style="text-align:left;background:#AFE6BA;"| 2009–10†
| style="text-align:left;"| Barcelona
| 19 || 0 || 13.5 || .416 || .439 || .879 || .8 || 1.3 || .5 || .0 || 6.2 || 5.9
|-
| style="text-align:left;"| 2010–11
| style="text-align:left;"| Barcelona
| 19 || 3 || 24.7 || .426 || .365 || .643 || .5 || 1.9 || .2 || .1 || 6.4 || 5.6
|-
| style="text-align:left;"| 2011–12
| style="text-align:left;"| Galatasaray
| 16 || 8 || 26.2 || .396 || .361 || .818 || 1.9 || 2.7 || .3 || .1 || 9.7 || 10.0
|- class="sortbottom"
| style="text-align:center;" colspan=2 | Career
| 218 || 135 || 25.2 || .433 || .386 || .836 || 1.6 || 2.7 || .9 || .0 || 11.6 || 11.8

Career awards and achievements

Panathinaikos
4× Greek League Champion: 2003, 2004, 2005, 2006
3× Greek Cup Winner: 2003, 2005, 2006

Barcelona
2× Spanish League Champion: 2009, 2011
3× Spanish Cup Winner: 2007, 2010, 2011
2× Spanish Super Cup Winner: 2009, 2010
 EuroLeague Champion: 2010

Slovenia junior national team
 1998 FIBA Europe Under-20 Championship:

Individual
 Slovenian League All-Star: 2001
 Led the EuroLeague 2001–02 season in free throw shooting percentage: 89.0%
 Led the Slovenian League in assists: 2002
 3× Greek League All-Star: 2003, 2005, 2006
 2× Greek League Finals MVP: 2003, 2005
 Led the 2003–04 Greek League season in free throw shooting percentage: 91.0%
 Greek League Best Five: 2005
 Greek League MVP: 2005
 Greek Cup MVP: 2005
 All-EuroLeague 2nd Team: 2005

References

External links

 Euroleague.net Profile
 FIBA Profile
 FIBA Europe Profile
 Eurobasket.com Profile
 Draftexpress.com Profile
 Italian League Profile 
 Spanish League Profile 
 Greek Basket League Profile 
 EuroCup Coaching Profile

1978 births
Living people
2006 FIBA World Championship players
2010 FIBA World Championship players
ABA League players
Bilbao Basket coaches
FC Barcelona Bàsquet B players
FC Barcelona Bàsquet players
Galatasaray S.K. (men's basketball) players
Gaziantep Basketbol players
KD Slovan players
KK Krka players
Liga ACB players
Panathinaikos B.C. players
Point guards
Ratiopharm Ulm coaches
Shooting guards
Slovenian basketball coaches
Slovenian expatriate basketball people in Germany
Slovenian expatriate basketball people in Greece
Slovenian expatriate basketball people in Italy
Slovenian expatriate basketball people in Spain
Slovenian expatriate basketball people in Turkey
Slovenian men's basketball players
Slovenian people of Serbian descent
Basketball players from Ljubljana
S.S. Felice Scandone players